This article lists the main ice climbing events and their results for 2018.

World Youth Championships 
The 2018 UIAA Ice Climbing World Youth Championships were held in Malbun, Liechtenstein.

World Cup

European Cup

References

External links
 International Climbing and Mountaineering Federation Website (UIAA)

Ice climbing
2018 in sports
2018 sport-related lists